Union Meeting House, also known as the Millens Bay Union Church, is a historic church located at Millens Bay in the Town of Cape Vincent in Jefferson County, New York. It was built between 1869 and 1871 as a cooperative Episcopal and Methodist union church, as a mission of St. John's Episcopal Church in the village of Cape Vincent and of the Methodist-Episcopal Church in St. Lawrence.   It is a one-story wood-frame structure, rectangular in plan, one bay wide and four bays long.  It features a steeply pitched gable roof and steeple with a six sided spire. It can seat about 200 individuals.  Interdemoninational services are held on Sunday mornings in July and August each summer.

It was listed on the National Register of Historic Places in 1985.

References

Churches on the National Register of Historic Places in New York (state)
Episcopal church buildings in New York (state)
Churches completed in 1869
Churches in Jefferson County, New York
19th-century Episcopal church buildings
1869 establishments in New York (state)
National Register of Historic Places in Jefferson County, New York